Church Hill is a town in Queen Anne's County, Maryland, United States. The population was 745 at the 2010 census.

History
Bishopton, Churchill Theatre-Community Building, Kennersley, and St. Luke's Church are listed on the National Register of Historic Places.

Geography
Church Hill is located at  (39.144441, -75.984869).

Transportation
The primary means of travel to and from Church Hill is by road, and three state highways serve the town. The most prominent of these is Maryland Route 213, which traverses the town north to south as the highway makes its way along the eastern shore of the Chesapeake Bay. The other two state highways serving Church Hill are Maryland Route 300 and Maryland Route 19, both of which connect to nearby U.S. Route 301. US 301 provides high speed travel to nearby metropolitan areas such as Philadelphia and Washington D.C..

Demographics

2010 census
As of the census of 2010, there were 745 people, 275 households, and 194 families living in the town. The racial makeup of the town was 73.7% White, 14.2% African American, 0.1% Native American, 1.9% Asian, 7.1% from other races, and 3.0% from two or more races. Hispanic or Latino of any race were 10.1% of the population.

There were 275 households, of which 44.0% had children under the age of 18 living with them, 49.8% were married couples living together, 14.9% had a female householder with no husband present, 5.8% had a male householder with no wife present, and 29.5% were non-families. 23.6% of all households were made up of individuals, and 10.5% had someone living alone who was 65 years of age or older. The average household size was 2.71 and the average family size was 3.20.

The median age in the town was 32.9 years. 29.5% of residents were under the age of 18; 8.1% were between the ages of 18 and 24; 28.8% were from 25 to 44; 23.7% were from 45 to 64; and 9.9% were 65 years of age or older. The gender makeup of the town was 49.7% male and 50.3% female.

2000 census
As of the census of 2000, there were 530 people, 210 households, and 139 families living in the town. The racial makeup of the town was 76.79% White, 21.70% African American, 0.19% Native American, 0.19% Asian, 0.38% from other races, and 0.75% from two or more races. Hispanic or Latino of any race were 2.45% of the population.

There were 210 households, out of which 33.3% had children under the age of 18 living with them, 46.7% were married couples living together, 15.2% had a female householder with no husband present, and 33.8% were non-families. 27.1% of all households were made up of individuals, and 8.1% had someone living alone who was 65 years of age or older. The average household size was 2.48 and the average family size was 3.03.

In the town, the population was spread out, with 26.6% under the age of 18, 8.3% from 18 to 24, 30.8% from 25 to 44, 20.6% from 45 to 64, and 13.8% who were 65 years of age or older. The median age was 36 years. For every 100 females, there were 83.4 males. For every 100 females age 18 and over, there were 81.8 males.

The median income for a household in the town was $48,250, and the median income for a family was $51,875. Males had a median income of $32,857 versus $26,964 for females. The per capita income for the town was $18,487. About 11.7% of families and 12.9% of the population were below the poverty line, including 23.4% of those under age 18 and 12.2% of those age 65 or over.

Notable person

William J. Wallace - highly decorated Lieutenant General, USMC

References

External links 

Map of Church Hill, from the Historical Society of Kent County collection

Towns in Maryland
Towns in Queen Anne's County, Maryland